John Stevens (1845 – 31 July 1916) was a Liberal Party Member of Parliament in New Zealand.

Biography

Early life
Stevens was born in Wellington in 1845. Stevens moved north and resided in first the Rangitikei then Manawatu districts from 1854. He made a living in agricultural until 1873, when he was hired by Henry Russell as an assistant and interpreter during a Native Lands Alienation Commission at Napier. He pursued an occupation as a Maori interpreter and land agent, then began an auctioneering and land agency in 1875.

Member of Parliament

Stevens represented the Rangitikei electorate from 1881 to 1884 when he was defeated, and then from 1893 to 1896.

Stevens contested the 1892 Rangitikei by-election as an Independent Liberal as the Liberal Party was reluctant to endorse him in light of the recent Bruce by-election in which the candidate the Liberal Party endorsed lost by a large margin. Stevens lost by only 61 votes.

He later returned to parliament, representing the Manawatu electorate from 1896 to 1902 when he was defeated, and from 1905 to 1908 when he was again defeated. Stevens served as the Liberal Party's Senior Whip from 1900 until 1902.

Later life
In his later years, he had become blind and his lower limbs were paralysed, but he was in good spirits and would not allow others to sympathise with him. He was in the midst of a conversation with friends when he leaned back and died on 31 July 1916.

Notes

References

1845 births
1916 deaths
New Zealand Liberal Party MPs
New Zealand MPs for North Island electorates
Members of the New Zealand House of Representatives
Unsuccessful candidates in the 1884 New Zealand general election
Unsuccessful candidates in the 1890 New Zealand general election
Unsuccessful candidates in the 1902 New Zealand general election
Unsuccessful candidates in the 1908 New Zealand general election
Unsuccessful candidates in the 1887 New Zealand general election
19th-century New Zealand politicians